Sandro Klić (born 5 October 1981) is a Croatian retired football player.

Club career 
Born in Rijeka, as a player he started with HNK Rijeka where he was top scorer during the 2002–03 and 2003-04 seasons. He continued his career with NK Zagreb and NK Pomorac.

International career
He was capped for Croatian youth national team at various age categories.

Club statistics

References

External links

1981 births
Living people
Footballers from Rijeka
Association football forwards
Croatian footballers
Croatia youth international footballers
Croatia under-21 international footballers
HNK Rijeka players
NK Zagreb players
NK Pomorac 1921 players
NK Grobničan players
Croatian Football League players